Seven Sinners is a 1936 British thriller film directed by Albert de Courville and starring Edmund Lowe, Constance Cummings and Felix Aylmer. In the U.S. it was known under this title and also as Doomed Cargo. The screenplay concerns an American detective and his sidekick, who travel from France to England to take on a gang of international criminals.

The film was made at Lime Grove Studios by Gainsborough Pictures. Its sets were designed by the Hungarian art director Ernö Metzner.

Plot
During Carnival in Nice, somewhat drunk, New York private detective Ed Harwood accidentally stumbles into the hotel room of Heinrich Wagner, who had helped him earlier that evening. He finds Wagner dead, but by the time he fetches the hotel manager and others, the corpse has disappeared. They all assume Harwood imagined it, including Caryl Fenton, a Worldwide Insurance Company employee sent to take him to Scotland to investigate a robbery.

Unable to convince anyone otherwise, he boards a train with Fenton. However, the train crashes. When Harwood comes to, he finds the missing body nearby. On the dead man's shirt cuff, he finds written an address in Paris; he takes the cuff with him, but the body is afterwards destroyed by fire. He tells Paul Turbé, the assistant prefect of police, his theory that the wreck was deliberate, to try to conceal the murder. Turbé confirms that it was no accident – the railway signals were tampered with – but is skeptical of Harwood's hypothesis. Harwood bets him $5000 that he will catch the killer, and devotes no further attention to the case in Scotland (which is eventually solved without his and Fenton's help).

In Paris, Harwood and Fenton go to the address; they inform the occupant, whose name is Hoyt, that Wagner was killed in the train wreck. The man claims he had not heard of the wreck, although it is the front-page story of the newspapers in his wastebasket. Harwood recognizes a photo of a Buenos Aires racetrack, but the man says it came with the apartment. That night, Harwood breaks into the place, with Fenton in tow. They find the suite almost completely empty of furniture. However, Harwood finds an old banquet invitation from the "Lord Mayor Elect and the Sheriffs of London" to "Axel Hoyt and party". Gunshots from across the street proves that the case is real.

They find a photograph of the banquet, showing Hoyt seated together with Wagner. A woman nearby is wearing a unique dress, which they trace to an Elizabeth Wentworth. At an event for a charity called Pilgrims of Peace, Harwood manages to strike up a conversation with Wentworth. When he remarks that recently he saw her acquaintance, Hoyt, she informs him that Hoyt died three years ago. They trace the doctor responsible for Hoyt's death certificate, but he has been unexpectedly called away to Southampton. They drive off after his train, but he is killed when it crashes into a lorry left on the tracks at a crossing.

While talking to the local chief constable, Harwood is surprised when Turbé shows up. Turbé shows him that the doctor's cuff link looks exactly like Wagner's. In fact, they show the emblem of the Pilgrims of Peace. Harwood and Fenton attend a Pilgrims of Peace rally, where Hoyt is calling himself Father Planchat. They learn that the leaders are about to board a relief ship bound for Bordeaux.

To escape, Harwood starts a brawl. He and Fenton race to catch the boat train, where they encounter both Turbé and the Pilgrims' leaders. Harwood asks Turbé to bring the two Scotland Yard agents in on his signal. Then Harwood and Fenton confront the Pilgrims in the dining car. Harwood has been in touch with the Buenos Aires police: he now accuses the Pilgrims of gunrunning, something Hoyt also did there. However, as Harwood glances at Turbé, he realises that he too was in the banquet photograph, with his back turned. Harwood informs the gang members that Turbé has double-crossed them. He was worried about being exposed, but his associates applied pressure to force him to continue working with them. Instead, he set about killing them all. Turbé uncouples the dining car, leaving it to be destroyed by a following train. The gang try to escape from the front of the car, but the door is locked; they are killed. Harwood and Fenton survive by escaping from the back.

Turbé is killed while trying to escape arrest. Afterward, Harwood and Fenton decide to get married.

Cast
 Edmund Lowe as Edward "Ed" Harwood 
 Constance Cummings as Caryl Fenton 
 Thomy Bourdelle as Paul Turbé 
 Henry Oscar as Axel Hoyt 
 Felix Aylmer as Sir Charles Webber 
 Joyce Kennedy as Elizabeth Wentworth 
 O. B. Clarence as Registrar 
  Mark Lester as Chief Constable Captain Fitzgerald
 Allan Jeayes as Heinrich Wagner 
 Anthony Holles as Reception Clerk 
 David Horne as Hotel Manager 
 Edwin Laurence as Guildhall Guide 
 James Harcourt as Vicar

Production
It was one of the first collaborations between Sidney Gilliat and Frank Launder. Gilliat says the film was heavily influenced by American models such as The Thin Man.

Critical reception
Frank Nugent, The New York Times critic, called it "a crisp, humorous and deftly turned murder mystery" and noted "an unmistakable resemblance to the Hitchcock melodrama [The 39 Steps] in the picture's rapid direction, urbanity and cleverness."

References

Bibliography
 Low, Rachael. Filmmaking in 1930s Britain. George Allen & Unwin, 1985.
 Wood, Linda. British Films, 1927-1939. British Film Institute, 1986.

External links

1936 films
1930s crime thriller films
1930s mystery thriller films
British black-and-white films
British crime thriller films
British mystery thriller films
British films based on plays
Films directed by Albert de Courville
Films set in England
Films set in London
Films set in Nice
Films set in Paris
Films shot at Lime Grove Studios
Gainsborough Pictures films
Rail transport films
Films scored by Jack Beaver
1930s English-language films
1930s British films